Janine Tatiana Santos Lélis (born 20 January 1974) is a Cape Verdean lawyer and politician currently serving as the Minister of State, Defense and Territorial Cohesion. She was a member of African Parliament and national member of the Specialized Committee on Legal Affairs and President of CPI.

Education 
Lélis earned a Law degree from the Federal University of Rio de Janeiro and Post-graduate degree in Business and Labor Law in 2006.

Career 
Lélis legal career started at the TACV from 1998 to 2008 and was a member of the Justice Committee of the African Parliament and Vice-President of the Union of Young African Parliamentarians. From 2006 to 2016, she was a municipal member and leader of the Independent Group for Change and was elected to African Parliament from 2011 to 2016. She served as Minister of Justice and Labour before being transferred to the Ministry of Defense and Territorial Cohesion as Minister of State. She was a member of the African Parliament from 2011 to 2016, a national member of the Specialized Committee on Legal Affairs and President of CPI from 2006 to 2016, a municipal member and leader of the Independent Group for Change and a member of the Supervisory Board of the Cape Verde Bar Association from 2004 to 2008, a lawyer at TACV from 1998 to 2008, a lawyer since December 1998, a member of the Justice Committee of the African Parliament and Vice-President of the Union of Young African Parliamentarians.

References 

Living people
1974 births
Cape Verdean lawyers
Women government ministers of Cape Verde
Members of the National Assembly (Cape Verde)
Government ministers of Cape Verde
Federal University of Rio de Janeiro alumni